Camp Horseshoe is a summer camp for boys located in Rhinelander, Wisconsin. The camp was started in 1932 by Maurice Arthur Hirshberg ("Doc H")and Al Engelhardt. They were co-directors until Al left the camp leadership to Doc H. In 1990, the camp closed and was reopened in 2004, or Quenota, by former camper, Jordan Shiner and his wife, Fran. The camp is currently owned and operated by them. Camp Horseshoe offers activities such as sailing, skiing, basketball, volleyball, and trampball (four square on trampolines).

Campers 
The campers at Camp Horseshoe are boys ages 8–16 who come from all over the United States. The age groups range from Pioneers to Cabin 14ers. Campers play leagues (big and small) after a combine and a draft by league coaches. League teams compete in sporting events ranging from soccer to flag football (big leagues) and from basketball to tramp-ball (small leagues). Campers set goals for themselves to complete Na Ta Ne, a tradition where campers can try to do activities for a certain number of points to earn 150 points. Then they are inducted into a Na Ta Ne family. The families include Bear Family, Sun Family, Elk Family, Dancer Family, Wolf Family, Sage Family, Friend Family, Dancer Family, Fire Family, Falcon Family, Eagle Family, Bobcat Family, Bison Family, Moon Family, Star Family, Spruce Family, Sky Family, River Family and more. If a camper makes Na Ta Ne, he can try to complete Golden Horseshoe and have his name on plaques in the mess hall. If a camper completes Golden Horseshoe, he receives an adjective before his Na Ta Ne Family (for example: Joyful Sun). Every new camper has a big brother and a medallion that he can add to after making Na Ta Ne. Na Ta Ne and Golden Horseshoe are optional.

Spirit 
After sports games the sportsmanship is brought by both the winning and the losing teams by cheers they recite to one another. Horseshoe shouts and sings cheers so they can be heard from outside the mess hall.

Traditions 
Horseshoe sings songs such as "Hail to the Forest" that lead into taps and is competitive with events like Shoe Madness and Green/Blue. Shoe Madness has 10 teams (colleges) that complete for a mess hall plaque in many events. Green/Blue (Second Session) includes sporting events and a relay race at the end with two competing teams (Blue and Green). A newspaper is sent out every year called the Horseshoe Review.

Accreditation 
Camp Horseshoe for Boys is a member of the American Camp Association.

External links
 Camp Horseshoe Official Website
 American Camp Association Website

Horseshoe
Youth organizations based in Wisconsin
Buildings and structures in Oneida County, Wisconsin
Organizations based in Wisconsin
1933 establishments in Wisconsin
Youth organizations established in 1933